Main Street Commercial Historic District is a national historic district located at Hamlet, Richmond County, North Carolina. The district encompasses 23 contributing buildings, 3 contributing structures, and 1 contributing object in the central business district of Hamlet.  It includes buildings built between about 1900 to about 1940 and notable examples of Queen Anne, Art Deco, and Classical Revival architecture.  Located in the district is the separately listed Seaboard Air Line Passenger Depot.  Other notable buildings include the Terminal Hotel (c. 1912), Union Building (c. 1920), the Bank of Hamlet (1912), the Old Hamlet Opera House (1912, 1927), and the U.S. Post Office (1940), a Works Progress Administration project.

It was added to the National Register of Historic Places in 1992.

References

Works Progress Administration in North Carolina
Historic districts on the National Register of Historic Places in North Carolina
Queen Anne architecture in North Carolina
Art Deco architecture in North Carolina
Neoclassical architecture in North Carolina
Buildings and structures in Richmond County, North Carolina
National Register of Historic Places in Richmond County, North Carolina